Theodoros Dimitriou (1898, date of death unknown) was a Greek football player who played for the club Panionios G.S.S. He was member of the national team for the 1920 Olympic Games in Antwerp.

References

External links

1898 births
Year of death unknown
Greek footballers
Footballers at the 1920 Summer Olympics
Olympic footballers of Greece
Association football forwards